The 4th constituency of the Haut-Rhin is a French legislative constituency in the Haut-Rhin département.

Description

Haut-Rhin’s 4th Constituency stretches across the width of the departement from the Rhine in the east to the Vosges Mountains in the West. It lies between Colmar and Mulhouse.

Like most of Haut-Rhin it has remained steadfastly conservative throughout the 5th Republic strongly supporting the Gaullist parties. The boundaries of the seat are now radically different following the realignment of French constituencies prior to the 2012 legislative election, which reduced the representation in Haut-Rhin from seven to six members.

In 2022, while all other constituencies in Haut-Rhin saw Gaullist centre-right candidates lose their seats to candidates in the centrist Ensemble Citoyens alliance, Raphaël Schellenberger retained the 4th constituency for LR.

Historic Representation

Election results

2022

 
 
|-
| colspan="8" bgcolor="#E9E9E9"|
|-

2017

 
 
 
 
 
 
 
 
|-
| colspan="8" bgcolor="#E9E9E9"|
|-
 
 

 
 
 
 
 Source:

2012

 
 
 
 
|-
| colspan="8" bgcolor="#E9E9E9"|
|-

Sources

4